"Face to Face" is a song by the rock band Sevendust. It is from the band's fourth studio album Seasons and was released in 2004.

Charts

References

Sevendust songs
2004 singles
Songs written by Clint Lowery
Songs written by Morgan Rose
TVT Records singles
2003 songs
Song recordings produced by Butch Walker
Songs written by Butch Walker
Songs written by Vinnie Hornsby
Songs written by Lajon Witherspoon
Songs written by John Connolly (musician)